The 1935 LSU Tigers football team represented Louisiana State University (LSU) in the 1935 college football season. The team was led by halfback Abe Mickal and end Gaynell Tinsley. It was Bernie Moore's first of thirteen seasons as head coach of the Tigers. 

The Williamson System, an NCAA-designated "major selector" of national championships, ranked TCU first, SMU second, and LSU third in its final post-bowl rankings. The accompanying column notes, though, that "there was no undisputable national champion in 1935". In an apparent error, the NCAA records book notes TCU and LSU as Williamson System national co-champions for the season. the LSU athletic department does not recognize the team as national champions, although their media guide does mention the award's inclusion in the NCAA records book.

Schedule

Sugar Bowl
Four days of rain turned an expected passing battle into a punting duel between quarterbacks Sammy Baugh of TCU and LSU's Abe Mickal. The Tigers threatened often, once getting to the six-inch line, but TCU's Taldon Manton kicked a winning 36-yard field goal. LSU scored when All-America end Gaynell Tinsley harassed Baugh into throwing an incompletion in the TCU end zone for an automatic safety.

References

LSU
LSU Tigers football seasons
Southeastern Conference football champion seasons
LSU Tigers football